, also known as NHK, is a Japanese public broadcaster. NHK, which has always been known by this romanized initialism in Japanese, is a statutory corporation funded by viewers' payments of a television license fee.

NHK operates two terrestrial television channels (NHK General TV and NHK Educational TV), four satellite television channels (NHK BS1 and NHK BS Premium; as well as two ultra-high-definition television channels, NHK BS4K and NHK BS8K), and three radio networks (NHK Radio 1, NHK Radio 2, and NHK FM).

NHK also provides an international broadcasting service, known as NHK World-Japan. NHK World-Japan is composed of NHK World TV, NHK World Premium, and the shortwave radio service Radio Japan (RJ). World Radio Japan also makes some of its programs available on the Internet.

NHK was the first broadcaster in the world to broadcast in high-definition (using multiple sub-Nyquist sampling encoding, also known as Hi-Vision) and in 8K.

History
Tokyo Broadcasting Station, along with separate organizations in Osaka and Nagoya, began radio broadcasts in 1925. The three stations merged under the first incarnation of NHK in August 1926. NHK was modelled on the BBC of the United Kingdom, and the merger and reorganisation was carried out under the auspices of the pre-war Ministry of Communications. NHK's second radio network began in 1931, and the third radio network (FM) began in 1937.

Radio broadcasting
NHK began shortwave broadcasting on an experimental basis in the 1930s, and began regular English- and Japanese-language shortwave broadcasts in 1935 under the name Radio Japan, initially aimed at ethnic Japanese listeners in Hawaii and the west coast of North America. By the late 1930s, NHK's overseas broadcasts were known as Radio Tokyo, which became an official name in 1941.

In November 1941, the Imperial Japanese Army nationalised all public news agencies and coordinated their efforts via the Information Liaison Confidential Committee. All published and broadcast news reports became official announcements of the Imperial Army General Headquarters in Tokyo for the duration of World War II. The famous Tokyo Rose wartime programs were broadcasts by NHK. NHK also broadcast the Gyokuon-hōsō, the surrender speech made by Emperor Hirohito, in August 1945.

Following the war, in September 1945, the Allied occupation administration under General Douglas MacArthur banned all international broadcasting by NHK, and repurposed several NHK facilities and frequencies for use by the Far East Network (now American Forces Network). Japanese-American radio broadcaster Frank Shozo Baba joined NHK during this time and led an early post-war revamp of its programming. Radio Japan resumed overseas broadcasts in 1952.

A new  was enacted in 1950, which made NHK a listener-supported independent corporation and simultaneously opened the market for commercial broadcasting in Japan. NHK started television broadcasting in 1953, followed by its educational TV channel in 1959 and color television broadcasts in 1960.

NHK opened the first stage of its current headquarters in Japan's capital city's special ward Shibuya as an international broadcasting center for the 1964 Summer Olympics, the first widely televised Olympic Games. The complex was gradually expanded through 1973, when it became the headquarters for NHK. The previous headquarters adjacent to Hibiya Park was redeveloped as the Hibiya City high-rise complex.

Satellite broadcasting
NHK began experimental satellite broadcasting with the NHK BS 1 channel in 1984, followed by NHK BS 2 in 1985. Both channels began regular broadcasts in 1989. In April 2011, BS 1 was rebranded while BS 2 channel ceased broadcasting and was replaced by "BS Premium" which broadcasts on the channel formerly used by BShi.

International satellite broadcasts to North America and Europe began in 1995, which led to the launch of NHK World in 1998. It became free-to-air over the Astra 19.2°E (Astra 1L) and Eurobird satellites in Europe in 2008.

Digital television

NHK began digital television broadcasting in December 2000 through BS Digital, followed by terrestrial digital TV broadcasts in three major metropolitan areas in 2003. NHK's digital television coverage gradually expanded to cover almost all of Japan by 24 July 2011, when analog transmissions were discontinued (except in three prefectures that were heavily affected by the 2011 Tōhoku earthquake and tsunami – Iwate, Miyagi, Fukushima – where it was discontinued on 31 March 2012).

Studies of Broadcasting

From 1963 to 1999, NHK published the journal Studies of broadcasting: an international annual of broadcasting science.

Organization
NHK is a dependent corporation chartered by the Japanese Broadcasting Act and primarily funded by license fees. NHK World broadcasting (for overseas viewers/listeners) is funded by the Japanese government. The annual budget of NHK is subject to review and approval by the Diet of Japan. The Diet also appoints the twelve-member board of governors (経営委員会 keiei iinkai) that oversees NHK.

NHK is managed on a full-time basis by an  consisting of a president, vice president and seven to ten managing directors who oversee the areas of NHK operations. The executive board reports to the board of governors.

Subsidiaries
NHK Enterprises, Inc. (NHKエンタープライズ, abbreviated NEP): Established on April 1, 2005.
NHK Educational Corporation (株式会社 NHKエデュケーショナル): Established on May 30, 1989.
NHK ART, Inc. (株式会社ＮＨＫアート): Established on July 10, 1961.
NHK Publishing, Inc. (NHK出版): Established on April 1, 1931.
Japan International Broadcasting Inc. (株式会社日本国際放送)/JIB: Established on April 4, 2008.
NHK International, Inc. (一般財団法人NHKインターナショナル): Established on July 1, 1980.
NHK Global Media Services, Inc. (株式会社NHKグローバルメディアサービス): Established on April 1, 2009, by merging NHK Joho Network, Inc. ((株)NHK情報ネットワーク) (established on January 1, 1989) and Japan Teletex Co. Ltd. (日本文字放送) (established in 1985).
NHK Cosmomedia America, Inc.: Created by merging Japan Network Group (Media International Corporation) and NHK Enterprises America, Inc. on April 1, 2010, but its licence was granted on November 12, 2008. The company's logo was filed on March 23, 2010, and registered on December 13, 2011.
NHK Cosmomedia (Europe) Limited: Created by merging JSTV (company founded on November 8, 1989) and NHK Enterprises Europe in April 2010.
NHK Technologies, Inc. (株式会社ＮＨＫテクノロジーズ): Established on April 1, 2019, by merging NHK Integrated Technology Inc. (株式会社ＮＨＫアイテック) and NHK Media Technology, Inc. (株式会社NHKメディアテクノロジー).
Broadcasting Satellite System Corporation (株式会社　放送衛星システム)/B-SAT: Established on April 13, 1993.
NHK Engineering System, Inc. (一般財団法人ＮＨＫエンジニアリングシステム): Established on December 22, 1981.
NHK GAKUEN (学校法人 NHK学園): Established in 1962-10-01 (学校法人日本放送協会学園). It was renamed to the current name on April 1, 2018.
NHK Symphony Orchestra, Tokyo (公益財団法人 NHK交響楽団): Established on April 27, 1942, as Japan Symphony Orchestra (財団法人日本交響楽団). On August 1, 1951, it was renamed to NHK Symphony Orchestra (財団法人NHK交響楽団). It became a public interest incorporated foundation, and was renamed to current name on April 1, 2010.
NHK Public Welfare Organization/NHK HEARTS (社会福祉法人NHK厚生文化事業団): Established on August 31, 1960.
NHK Promotions Inc. (株式会社NHKプロモーション)/(株式会社エヌエイチケイプロモーション): Established on October 1, 1977, as NHK Promote Service Inc. (株式会社NHKプロモートサービス). It was renamed to current name in October 1989.
NHK CULTURE CENTER (株式会社エヌエイチケイ文化センター)/(NHKカルチャー): Established on December 1, 1978.
NHK SERVICE CENTER, INC. (一般財団法人 NHK サービスセンター): Established on February 28, 1951.
NHK BUSINESS SERVICES INC. (NHK営業サービス株式会社): Established on January 17, 1990.
BS Conditional Access Systems Co., Ltd. (株式会社 ビーエス・コンディショナルアクセスシステムズ)/B-CAS (ビーキャス): Established on February 22, 2000.
NHK Business Create Inc. (株式会社 ＮＨＫビジネスクリエイト): Established on April 1, 2009, by merger (株式会社NHKオフィス企画), (株式会社NHK共同サービス).
NHK-Communications Training Institute (一般財団法人NHK放送研修センター): Established on August 8, 1985.

Former subsidiaries
NHK Integrated Technology Inc. (株式会社ＮＨＫアイテック): Established on July 23, 1969, as NHK Integrated Technology Inc. (全日本テレビサービス株式会社). It was merged into NHK Technologies, Inc. on April 1, 2019.
NHK Media Technology, Inc. (株式会社NHKメディアテクノロジー): Established in April 2008 by merging NHK Technical Service (株式会社NHKテクニカルサービス) (established October 9, 1984) and NHK Computer Service (株式会社NHKコンピューターサービス). It was merged into NHK Technologies, Inc. on April 1, 2019.

Services

Radio 
It maintains three radio stations available nationwide. 

 NHK Radio 1 (594 kHz AM) – news, talk, drama, sports and information. Launched in 1925 as Tokyo Broadcasting System JOAK and it became NHK Radio 1 in 2005.
 NHK Radio 2 (693 kHz AM) – education, language learning and culture. Launched in 1931.
 NHK FM Broadcast (82.5 MHz NHK FM) – classical music, news bulletins, popular music, Japanese pop music and folk music. Launched in 1969.
 All of them can also be tuned through the internet, within the national territory.

Television 
It manages two open signal channels through digital terrestrial television. Since Japan has a television network system, it schedules territorial disconnections in each of its centers. However, the NHK brand is common for the whole country. 

 NHK General TV (NHK-G): Pioneer of television in Japan, it began its broadcasts on February 1, 1953. Its offer is general and public service.
 NHK Educational TV (NHK-E): Educational and cultural channel, designed especially for children. It has been broadcasting since January 10, 1959. 

All of them can also be tuned through the internet, within the national territory. It also has two exclusive satellite channels, as well as two in ultra high definition. 

 NHK BS 1: Specialized in information, international documentaries and sports broadcasts. It was founded on May 12, 1984. 
 NHK BS Premium: Cultural and entertainment programming. It was founded on April 1, 2011.
 NHK BS4K: Programming in 4K, launched on December 1, 2018.
 NHK BS8K: 8K programming, launched on December 1, 2018.

License fee
The Broadcasting Act which governs NHK's funding stipulates anyone with equipment able to receive NHK must pay. The fee is standardized, with discounts for office workers and students who commute, as well a discount for residents of Okinawa prefecture. For viewers making annual payments by credit card with no special discounts, the reception fee is 13,600 yen per year for terrestrial reception only, and 24,090 yen per year for both terrestrial and broadcast satellite reception.

However, the Broadcasting Act specifies no punitive actions for nonpayment; as a result, after a rash of NHK-related scandals including an accounting one, the number of people who had not paid the license fee surpassed one million watchers. This incident sparked debate over the fairness of the fee system. In 2006, the NHK opted to take legal action against those most flagrantly in violation of the law.

This fee and how it is charged is unpopular with some citizens.

TV programming

NHK broadcasts a variety of programming. The following are noteworthy.

News
NHK offers local, national, and world news reports. NHK News 7 airs daily and is broadcast bilingually with both Japanese and English audio tracks on NHK General TV and NHK's international channels TV Japan and NHK World Premium. The flagship news program News Watch 9 is also bilingual and also airs on NHK General TV and the international channels and NHK World Premium. World News, a program which airs bulletins from international broadcasters interpreted in Japanese, is aired on NHK BS1 with Catch! Sekai no Top News in the morning and International News Report at night, with the latter also airing on NHK World Premium. News on NHK BS1 is aired at 50 minutes past the hour except during live sport events.

NHK also offers news for the deaf (which airs on NHK Educational TV), regional news (which airs on NHK General TV) and children's news. Newsline is an English-language newscast designed for foreign viewers and airs on NHK World.

In his book Broadcasting Politics in Japan: NHK and Television News, Ellis S. Krauss states: 'In the 1960s and 1970s, external critics of NHK news were complaining about the strict neutrality, the lack of criticism of government, and the 'self-regulation in covering events'. Krauss claims that little had changed by the 1980s and 1990s. After the Fukushima nuclear disaster in 2011, NHK was criticised for underplaying the dangers from radioactive contamination.

Emergency reporting
Under the Broadcasting Act, NHK is under the obligation to broadcast early warning emergency reporting in times of natural disasters such as earthquakes and tsunamis. Their national network of seismometers in cooperation with the Japan Meteorological Agency makes NHK capable of delivering earthquake early warnings seconds after detection, as well as a more detailed report with Shindo intensity measurements within two-to-three minutes after the quake. They also broadcast air attack warnings in the event of war, using the J-Alert system.

All warnings are broadcast in Japanese, with tsunami warnings also delivered in four foreign languages: English, Mandarin Chinese, Korean and Portuguese (Japan has small Chinese, Korean and Brazilian populations). The warnings were broadcast in these languages during the 11 March 2011 earthquake and tsunami.

Sports
NHK broadcasts sumo wrestling, baseball games, Olympic Games, soccer games, and a range of other sports. Their broadcast of the last two days of October 1952's autumn sumo tournament became the first ever televised sports broadcast in Japan.

Music
The NHK Symphony Orchestra, financially sponsored by NHK, was formerly (until 1951) the Japanese Symphony Orchestra. Its website details the orchestra's history and ongoing concert programme. Since 1953, NHK has broadcast the Kōhaku Uta Gassen song contest on New Year's Eve, ending shortly before midnight.

Drama
A sentimental morning show, a weekly jidaigeki and a year-long show, the Taiga drama, spearhead the network's fiction offerings.

Children
The longest running children's show in Japan,  started broadcasting in 1959 and still airs to this day Monday-Friday 17:36-18:00 JST, Sunday 17:30-17:54 JST with rebroadcasts Tuesday-Sunday 5:00-5:24 JST on NHK World Premium.

Employee and internal issues

Insider trading ban
In 2007, three employees of NHK were fined and fired for insider trading. They had profited by trading shares based on exclusive NHK knowledge.

On 11 July 2008, NHK introduced a ban prohibiting stock trading by employees, numbering around 5,700, who had access to its internal news information management system. The employees were required to pledge in writing that they would not trade in stocks, and were required to gain approval from senior staff in order to sell shares they already held. NHK banned short-term stock trading completed in periods of six months or less for all other employees.

The ban did not extend to employees' families, nor did NHK request any reports on their transactions.

Overwork death
On 24 July 2013, a reporter at NHK Metropolitan Broadcasting Center died of congestive heart failure. In May 2014, Shibuya Labor Standards Inspection Office of the Tokyo Labor Bureau certified it as a karōshi (overwork death). Although NHK did not report on this matter, it was announced in October 2017. Ryōichi Ueda, the chairman of NHK, visited the reporter's parents' home and apologized to them.

On-air issues

Criticism over comments about Japanese wartime history
NHK has occasionally faced various criticisms for its treatment of Japan's wartime history.

, the 21st head of NHK, caused controversy by discussing Japan's actions in World War II at his first news conference after being appointed on 20 December 2013. It was reported Momii said NHK should support the Japanese government in its territorial dispute with China and South Korea. He also caused controversy by what some describe as the playing down of the comfort women issue in World War II, according to the Taipei Times, stating "[South] Korea's statements that Japan is the only nation that forced this are puzzling. 'Give us money, compensate us', they say, but since all of this was resolved by the Japan-Korea peace treaty, why are they reviving this issue? It's strange." It was subsequently reported by The Japan Times that on his first day at NHK Momii asked members of the executive team to hand in their resignation on the grounds they had all been appointed by his predecessor.

At the end of April 2014, a number of civil society groups protested against Katsuto Momii's continuing tenure as director-general of NHK. The letter stated that if Momii did not resign by the end of April that its members would freeze their payments of the licence fee for half a year.

On 17 October 2014, The Times claimed to have received internal NHK documents which banned any reference to the Rape of Nanking, to Japan's use of wartime sex slaves during World War II, and to its territorial dispute with China in its English-language broadcasting.

Black Lives Matter video
On 10 June 2020, NHK apologized and took down an 80-second video about the Black Lives Matter movement and George Floyd protests that was criticized for its "crude" animation of protesters and its focus on economic inequality rather than police brutality.

An official statement was released through NHK's official website signed by Yuichi Tabata, head of NHK's International News Division.

Olympics documentary claims
On 9 January 2022, NHK issued an apology over false allegations made in Director Naomi Kawase's Tokyo Olympics documentary. Kawase was selected by the IOC in 2018 to cover Japanese reactions to the event and later, during the Coronavirus pandemic. Footage and captions in the documentary alleged that protesters were being paid money to attend anti-Olympics rallies. One of the men interviewed later stated he was "unsure" if he had actually attended any anti-Olympics rallies. NHK Osaka cited "editorial oversights" and "deficiencies in research," issuing an apology. Some anti-Olympic activists demanded that the documentary should be removed. Some activists were concerned that the misinformation was spread by NHK to silence those who 
opposed Tokyo Olympics during the pandemic. NHK denied that the footage was deliberately fabricated to mislead the public.
 On 13 January 2022 the NHK Osaka director Terunobu Maeda apologized during a press conference, admitting that the captions "should not have been included." Again he denied that the incident was a fabrication.

Logos

See also
Domo, the mascot of the NHK since 1998
Hobankyo – Organization based in Japan that enforces Fuji Television copyright issues
ISDB
Japan Prize Contest (NHK)
Japanese television programs
Media of Japan
NHK Science & Technology Research Laboratories
NHK Spring Company
Takashi Tachibana
Television in Japan
TV Japan – a mixed Japanese/English-language cable network partially owned by NHK airing in the United States
Ultra-high-definition television

References

Explanatory notes

Citations

General sources 
Johnston, Eric (7 July 2009). "NHK a fount of info, a lot of it from the government". The Japan Times, p. 3.
Seidensticker, Edward (1990). Tokyo Rising: The City Since the Great Earthquake. New York: Knopf. .

External links

 

 
1924 establishments in Japan
Commercial-free television networks
Government-owned companies based in Tokyo
International Emmy Awards Current Affairs & News winners
Japanese-language television stations
Television networks in Japan
Mass media companies based in Tokyo
Organizations established in 1926
Peabody Award winners
Publicly funded broadcasters
Radio in Japan
Television channels and stations established in 1953
Shibuya